Kajalgaon is a small town and the district headquarters of Chirang district which of Bodoland Territorial Region (BTR) in the state of Assam. The town is created from the continuous urban area of the Bongaigaon urban agglomeration. 

Villages in Chirang district